Casablanca is an American drama series, based on the 1942 film of the same name set in the genre of spying and intrigue during World War II. Five episodes were filmed but, following its NBC premiere on April 10, 1983, and two additional installments on April 17 and 24, it was taken off the air. The two remaining unaired episodes were ultimately scheduled four months later, during summer programming, and shown on August 27 and September 3.

Cast
David Soul as Rick Blaine
Reuven Bar-Yotam as Ferrari
Hector Elizondo as Capt. Louis Renault
Kai Wulff as Lt. Heinz
Patrick Horgan as Maj. Strasser
Ray Liotta as Sacha
Arthur Malet as Carl
Scatman Crothers as Sam

Characters
As in the 1942 feature, which was widely released in 1943 and won the Academy Award for Best Picture in March 1944, the main character is named Rick Blaine and is portrayed in 1983 by David Soul who was born in 1943. The role of French police captain Louis Renault, originated by Claude Rains, was assigned to Hector Elizondo, Sydney Greenstreet's black marketeer Ferrari was played by Reuven Bar-Yotam and Sacha the bartender, played in 1942 by Leonid Kinskey, a character actor usually seen in comical portrayals, was taken as a serious role by Ray Liotta.

Sam, Dooley Wilson's iconic piano player, was being interpreted by another veteran character player, Scatman Crothers, while Carl the maître d', created by still another familiar comical personality, "Cuddles" Sakall, returned in the person of latter-day character actor Arthur Malet. Finally, the main villain, Conrad Veidt's Major Strasser, who is fatally shot by Rick at the end of the film, is likewise back, in the portrayal by English actor Patrick Horgan. Strasser is also given an aide, Lieutenant Heinz, played by Kai Wulff. The series is described as taking place over a year before the events depicted in the 1942 film.

Episodes

US television ratings

References

External links 

1983 American television series debuts
1983 American television series endings
Television series by Warner Bros. Television Studios
NBC original programming
Television series set in the 1940s
English-language television shows
Live action television shows based on films
Television series based on adaptations